Nisha Pahuja (born 1978) is an independent Canadian filmmaker, born in New Delhi and raised in Toronto, Ontario. This writer/artist/director was introduced to film through studying English literature, working in social services and through working as a documentary researcher. She is currently a Rockefeller Foundation Bellagio Fellow. Nisha's first full-length film debut was in 2003 in Bollywood Bound, and more recently she produced a film The World Before Her (2012) which explored the diverse lifestyles of women competing to become Miss India and juxtaposing it with Hindu Nationalists fighting for their beliefs.

Early life 
Pahuja moved from India to Canada with her family when she was a child. Growing up, Nisha faced adversity as she was bombarded with a new "western lifestyle". She attributes her interest in film largely to her upbringing and she was constantly exposed to Hindi films and liked the roles that they offered Indian girls growing up in a Western context.

Pahuja is also a fellow of the Bellagio Centre, which is a part of the Rockefeller Foundation. This foundation promotes the well-being of humanity through various initiates and conferences led by individuals such as policy makers and scholars. The centre has a record of positive change including the Green Revolution and the Global AIDS Vaccine Initiative. Pahuja has always wanted to influence positive change and be a part of projects that benefit humanity which is reflected through the main themes of many of her films.

Career
Pahuja moved from her homeland of India to Toronto, Canada, but she still maintains close ties with India and visits regularly. After graduating with a Bachelor of Arts, English Language and Literature from the University of Toronto, Mississauga campus, in 1994, the filmmaker became increasingly interested in the film medium. Although she initially set out to be a writer while in university, after making a documentary for research purposes she realized her true calling.

Pahuja chose to focus her efforts on documentary filmmaking specifically because she loved seeking real individuals with real stories who paint a great picture of bigger societal problems. Real stories attract her because, "A human being reveals themselves to you in such a profound kind of way. I think I was just really drawn to that, to the idea of real people, real stories and being able to connect to them." At the beginning of her career, Pahuja worked as a researcher with Canadian filmmakers John Walker and Ali Kazimi. After gaining some experience, Nisha began her own filmmaking career and sought after characters who revealed things about our world in a broader context. Nisha's films are both a success back in her homeland and in North America, making her an international name. Instead of choosing a traditional Bollywood path, Nisha is quoted as saying "I have no plans to venture into Bollywood as I like directing real subjects"  which solidifies her main focus as a film maker on the documentary category.

The creation of Pahuja's most critically acclaimed film would not have been successful if not for the fundraiser support it received through an online Kickstarter fund. The World Before Her was a film that sparked the interests of a few international broadcasters in Toronto; however, it seemed impossible to create due to financial restrictions. After the 2012 Delhi gang rape case happened, Nisha was determined to screen her film across India to help undervalued women. In order to pursue her dream, Nisha created a Kickstarter with the goal of reaching $50,000 in order to screen the film across India and to various social workers to spark political change  The initial kickstarter has surpassed its original goal by reaching $57,000.

In 2022, Pahuja released the documentary To Kill a Tiger, which premiered at the 2022 Toronto International Film Festival and won the award for Best Canadian Feature Film.

Awards and nominations
Nisha's third film The World Before Her received the most attention as it won: 
"Best Canadian Feature Documentary" (2012) at the Edmonton Film Festival, 
"Best Documentary" (2012) at Hot Docs Canadian International Documentary Festival 
"Best Foreign Film" (2012) Traverse City Film Festival 
"Best International Document" (2013) Byron Bay International Film Festival

"Special Jury Mention" (2012) at the San Diego Asian Film Festival 
"Best Documentary Feature" (2012) at the Tribeca Film Festival 
"VFCC" Award for Best Screenplay at the Vancouver Film Critics Circle (2012) 
"Best Documentary"  (2012) at the Warsaw International Film Festival 
This film also had nominations in: 
Zurich Film Festival (2012) for "Best Documentary"  
Genie Awards (2012) for "Ted Rogers Best Feature Length Documentary" 
Canadian Screen Awards  (2013) "Best Feature Length Documentary" 
Santa Barbara Film Festival (2013) "Social Justice Award for Documentary Film"

Filmography 
 Bollywood Bound (2003) 
 Diamond Road (2007) 
 The World Before Her (2012)
 To Kill a Tiger (2022)

References

External links 
  Official Website
  Interview with the Director
  Indian Woman Filmmakers

1978 births
Living people
Canadian documentary film directors
Canadian women film directors
Film directors from Toronto
Indian documentary film directors
Indian women documentary filmmakers
Indian women film directors
People from New Delhi
Asian-Canadian filmmakers
Canadian women documentary filmmakers